L'Amour may refer to:

People 
 Louis L'Amour (1908–1988), American cowboy novelist
 Michelle L'amour (born 1980), American neo-burlesque performer

Other uses
 L'Amour (album), a 1983 album by Lewis
 L'Amour (film), a 1973 film
 L'Amour (music venue), a New York City rock venue

See also 
 Lamour (disambiguation)
 Amour (disambiguation)
 D'Amour, a surname
 De l'amour, an 1822 essay by Stendhal
 
 L'Amore (disambiguation)